Fontaine Maury Maverick Sr. (October 23, 1895 – June 7, 1954) was a Democratic member of the United States House of Representatives from Texas, representing the 20th district from January 3, 1935, to January 3, 1939. He is best remembered for his independence from the party and for coining the term "gobbledygook" for obscure and euphemistic bureaucratic language.

Background 
Maverick was born in San Antonio, Texas, the son of Albert and Jane Lewis (Maury) Maverick.  His grandparents were Samuel Maverick, one of the signers of the Texas Declaration of Independence and the source of the word maverick, and Mary Ann Adams Maverick. He studied at Texas Military Institute, the Virginia Military Institute, and the University of Texas.  Maverick's ancestor is Samuel Maverick (colonist), who is one of the earliest settlers of Massachusetts, one of the largest original land owners, and the first to bring slaves to Massachusetts.

Career

Early years
Maverick was admitted to the bar in 1916 and practiced law in San Antonio.  He was a first lieutenant in the infantry in World War I and earned the Silver Star and the Purple Heart. He served with the 28th Infantry Regiment, part of the 1st Division, and was involved in the Meuse–Argonne offensive.

In the 1920s, he was involved in the lumber and mortgage businesses.

Government service
From 1929 to 1931, he was the elected tax collector for Bexar County.

He was elected to the Seventy-fourth Congress in 1934, with support from the Hispanic population of his district, and re-elected in 1936 to the Seventy-fifth. During his 1934 campaign, Maverick enlisted Lyndon Johnson, a then little-known congressional secretary, to work for him during the Democratic primary. In the House, he was an ardent champion of Franklin Delano Roosevelt's New Deal. He angered the conservative Democrats running the party back in Texas, including John Nance Garner.

Maverick was the sole Texas Democrat to vote for the Anti-Lynching Bill of 1937.

He was defeated in the primary for a third term in 1938. He returned to Texas where he was elected Mayor of San Antonio, again with support from minority voters, serving from 1939 to 1941, when he was labeled a Communist and defeated. During World War II, he worked for the Office of Price Administration and the Office of Personnel Management, and served on the War Production Board and the Smaller War Plants Corporation.

Later years

After the war, he practiced law in San Antonio.

Personal and death

Maverick was a cousin of congressmen Abram Poindexter Maury and John W. Fishburne of Virginia and nephew of congressman James Luther Slayden of Texas, who married Ellen (Maury) at a Maury home called Piedmont in Charlottesville, Virginia, now part of the University of Virginia. They are related to Matthew Fontaine Maury, Dabney Herndon Maury, and the early and prominent Fontaine, Dabney, Brooke, Minor, Mercer, Herndon, Slaughter, and Slayden families of Virginia, Tennessee, and Texas.

He married Terrell Louise Dobbs and had a daughter and a son, San Antonio newspaper editorialist Maury Maverick, Jr. (who died in 2003 at the age of 82).

Maverick died on June 7, 1954. His widow later married the distinguished Texas author and historian Walter Prescott Webb.

Notes

References
 Retrieved on 2008-01-25.
Doyle, Judith Kaaz. Out of Step: Maury Maverick and the Politics of the Depression and the New Deal. Ph.D. diss., University of Texas at Austin, 1989.
Henderson, Richard B. Maury Maverick: A Political Biography. Austin: University of Texas Press, 1970.
Weiss, Stuart L. “Maury Maverick and the Liberal Bloc” Journal of American History 57 (March 1971): 880-95.
American Notes & Queries: Gobbledygook talk: Maury Maverick's name for the long high-sounding words of Washington's red-tape language, 1944.
Tuscaloosa News, of Alabama: The explanation sounds like gobbledeegook to me, 1945.

 Maury Family Tree (book) by Sue West Teague.

External links

1895 births
1954 deaths
Military personnel from San Antonio
United States Army officers
United States Army personnel of World War I
Mayors of San Antonio
Texas lawyers
Recipients of the Silver Star
Democratic Party members of the United States House of Representatives from Texas
20th-century American politicians
20th-century American lawyers
TMI Episcopal alumni